Respect the Architect is a studio album by American hip hop musician Blueprint. It was released on Weighless Recordings in 2014.

It was chosen by Columbus Alive as one of their Top 10 Local Albums of 2014.

Track listing

References

External links
 

2014 albums
Blueprint (rapper) albums